Roberto Moscatelli (30 May 1895 – 15 September 1980) was a sailor from Italy, who represented his country at the 1924 Summer Olympics in Le Havre, France.

References

Sources
 
 

Italian male sailors (sport)
Sailors at the 1924 Summer Olympics – 6 Metre
Olympic sailors of Italy
1895 births
1980 deaths